L.i.f.e is Josh Osho's first album. It reached #88 on the UK Albums Chart.

Track listing
All songs written by Josh Osho, Matt Prime and Tim Woodcock, with assistance from others on some tracks.

References

2012 debut albums